Southport Promenade Hospital is a Grade II listed former Victorian hospital that was situated on the Promenade at the seaside resort of Southport. The building has been restored into luxury apartments known as the Marine Gate Mansions.

History
The hospital was commissioned by the Southport Strangers Charity who established it using voluntary donations in Lord Street in 1806. It became the Southport Dispensary in 1823.

After the existing premises became too small, it moved to a new purpose-built building designed by Thomas Withnell in the Gothic Revival style in Seabank Road in 1853. Its name changed again when it was extended and became the Southport Convalescent Hospital and Sea-Bathing Hospital in 1862. It was extended again to a design by Paull and Bonella in 1881.

It served as a military hospital during both world wars. It joined the National Health Service in 1948 and developed as a treatment centre for patients with acute medical conditions, spinal injuries and orthopedic injuries. After the spinal injuries unit transferred to the Southport General Infirmary in 1988, the hospital finally closed in 1990.

The hospital, which is a Grade II listed building, was subsequently converted into luxury apartments and is now known as Marine Gate Mansions.

See also
Listed buildings in Southport

References

Hospital buildings completed in 1852
Defunct hospitals in England
Grade II listed buildings in Merseyside
Buildings and structures in Southport
1852 establishments in England
Hospitals in Merseyside
Voluntary hospitals